Government ENT Hospital, which serves ear, nose and throat Diseases across Coastal Andhra, is located in Pedda Waltair, Visakhapatnam.

Services
The hospital started a cochlear implant surgery programme in 2015. 

The hospital serves not only in Andhra Pradesh state it also serves patients from Odisha and Chhattisgarh and the hospital sees 500 outpatients a day and 50 surgeries in a week.  There is only one audiologist, but four vacancies, and this has been the situation since 2009. 

Medical staff at the hospital participated in a strike in September 2018 demanding revision of salaries.

The founding superintendent was Dr. M.V. Appa Rao

References

 Hospitals in Visakhapatnam
Year of establishment missing